Proctoporus guentheri, also known commonly as Günther's lightbulb lizard , is a species of lizard in the family Gymnophthalmidae. The species occurs in South America.

Etymology
The specific name, guentheri, is in honor of German-born British herpetologist Albert Günther.

Geographic range
P. guentheri is found in Bolivia (Cochabamba, La Paz, and Santa Cruz departments) and Peru (Cuzco Region).

Habitat

Reproduction
P. guentheri is oviparous.

References

Further reading
Barbour T, Noble GK (1921). "Amphibians and reptiles from southern Peru collected by the Peruvian Expedition of 1914–1915 under the auspices of Yale University and the National Geographic Society". Proceedings of the United States National Museum 58: 609–620. (Oreosaurus anomalus, new species, pp. 614–616).
Boettger O (1891). "Reptilien und Batrachier aus Bolivia". Zoologischer Anzeiger 14: 343–347. (Oreosaurus guentheri, new species, p. 345). (in German).
Boulenger GA (1902). "Descriptions of new Batrachians and Reptiles from the Andes of Peru and Bolivia". Annals and Magazine of Natural History, Seventh Series 10: 394–402. (Oreosaurus ocellifer, new species, pp. 400–401).
Dirksen L, De la Riva I (1999). "The lizards and amphisbaenians of Bolivia (Reptilia, Squamata): checklist, localities, and bibliography". Graellsia 55: 199–215. (Oreosaurus guentheri).

Proctoporus
Reptiles of Bolivia
Endemic fauna of Bolivia
Reptiles described in 1891
Taxa named by Oskar Boettger